P1101 or P.1101 may refer to :
 Messerschmitt Me P.1101, a 1944 single-seat, single-jet fighter 
 a Hawker Hunter two-seat trainer prototype